Ioachim Miloia (3 May 1897, Ferendia, Timiș County – 25 March 1940) was a Romanian painter, historian, manager of the Banat Museum in Timișoara and professor at the Technical University in Timișoara.

Life 
He graduated from high school and the Theological Academy in Caransebeș, Romania. Afterwards he studied at the Faculty of Letters and the National University of Art in Bucharest, from 1919 to 1920.

As a painter, together with Catul Bogdan, he created the mural painting in the Iosefin Orthodox Church in Timișoara. Further examples of his work can be found in churches in Folia, Topolovăţu Mare, Cuptoare-Secu, Bocşa Montană, Jebel, Oraviţa and Anina.

In the late 1920s he was appointed general manager of the Banat Museum and in the '30s he headed the Banat Regional Archives.

He died in 1950 in Cluj, following a prolonged illness.

In his honor, municipal authorities in Timișoara named a street after him.

Works 
A Gallery of Classical Masters - Painting of the Renaissance
The Legend of the Cross in Medieval Art and Literature
Considerations Upon the Renaissance
Studies and Articles Upon Art
Studies and Articles upon History

Notes

References
 Mircea Miloia, Aurel Turcuș, Gheorghe Mudura, Nicolae Săcară - Omagiu Ioachim Miloia. Un erudit cărturar (1897–1940)., Timișoara: Ed. Mirton, 1997
 Lucian Predescu - Enciclopedia României. Cugetarea, București: Editura Saeculum, 1999, 

Romanian painters